The 1985 Winter Universiade, the XII Winter Universiade, took place in Belluno, Italy.

Medal table

1985
U
U
U
Multi-sport events in Italy
Sport in Veneto
February 1985 sports events in Europe
Winter sports competitions in Italy